Givenchy-le-Noble is a commune in the Pas-de-Calais department in the Hauts-de-France region of France.

Geography

Population

Places of interest
 A two kilometres long, double row of lime trees established in 1850 on each side of the road between Givenchy chateau and Lignereuil chateau.
 The church of St. Brigude, dating from the eighteenth century.
 The eighteenth-century chateau, built in 1716 by François de Lelès.

See also
Communes of the Pas-de-Calais department

References

Givenchylenoble